Birk Rural District is a rural district (dehestan) in the Central District of Mehrestan County, in Sistan and Baluchestan province, Iran. At the 2006 census, its population was 6,648, in 1,461 families.  The rural district has 41 villages.

References 

Rural Districts of Sistan and Baluchestan Province
Mehrestan County